Kreipe is a German surname. Notable people with the surname include:

Heinrich Kreipe (1895–1976), German general
Werner Kreipe (1904–1967), German general

German-language surnames